Uukkivi is an Estonian language surname. Notable people with the surname include:

Heinrich Uukkivi (1912–1943), Estonian footballer, bandy, and ice hockey player
Ivo Uukkivi (born 1965), Estonian actor and singer
Raivo Uukkivi (born 1962), Estonian politician 

Estonian-language surnames